Seiyōdō Tomiharu (青陽堂 富春 1733–1810) was a Japanese netsuke carver, and the leader of its Iwami school. 

His daughter Seiyōdō Bunshōjo (1764–1838) became a renowned artist as well. A disciple of his school was Kanman (1793–1859).

References

External links 

1733 births
1810 deaths
Japanese woodcarvers
Japanese sculptors
18th-century sculptors
Male sculptors
Netsuke-shi